Edgewood, also known as the Thomas House, is a historic Federal-style house in Montgomery, Alabama.  The two-story frame building was built in 1821 by Zachariah T. Watkins.  It is the oldest surviving residence in Montgomery.  It was added to the National Register of Historic Places on April 24, 1973.

References

Houses on the National Register of Historic Places in Alabama
Houses completed in 1821
Federal architecture in Alabama
National Register of Historic Places in Montgomery, Alabama
Houses in Montgomery, Alabama